Tiberias is an Israeli city on the western shore of the Sea of Galilee. A major Jewish center during Late Antiquity, it has been considered since the 16th century one of Judaism's Four Holy Cities, along with Jerusalem, Hebron, and Safed.

Tiberias was founded circa 20 CE by Herod Antipas and was named after Roman emperor Tiberius. It became a major political and religious hub of the Jews in the Land of Israel after the destruction of Jerusalem and the desolation of Judea during the Jewish–Roman wars. From the time of the second through the tenth centuries CE, Tiberias was the largest Jewish city in the Galilee, and much of the Mishna and the Jerusalem Talmud were compiled there. Tiberias flourished during the early Islamic period, when it served as the capital of Jund al-Urdunn and became a multi-cultural trading center. The city slipped in importance following several earthquakes, foreign incursions, and after the Mamluks turned Safed into the capital of Galilee. The city was greatly damaged by an earthquake in 1837, after which it was rebuilt, and it grew steadily following the Zionist Aliyah in the 1880s. 

In early modern times, Tiberias was a mixed city; under British rule it had a majority Jewish population, but with a significant Arab community. During the 1947–1948 civil war in Mandatory Palestine, fighting broke out between the Jewish residents of Tiberias and its Palestinian Arab minority. As the Haganah took over, British troops evacuated the entire Palestinian Arab population; they were unable to return after the war, such that today the city has an almost exclusively Jewish population. After the war ended, the new Israeli authorities destroyed the Old City of Tiberias. A large number of Jewish immigrants to Israel subsequently settled in Tiberias.

Today, Tiberias is  an important tourist center due to its proximity to the Sea of Galilee and religious sanctity to Judaism and Christianity. The city also serves as a regional industrial and commercial center. Its immediate neighbour to the south, Hammat Tiberias, which is now part of modern Tiberias, has been known for its hot springs, believed to cure skin and other ailments, for some two thousand years.

History
 See Diocese of Tiberias for ecclesiastical history

Biblical era
Jewish tradition holds that Tiberias was built on the site of the ancient Israelite village of Rakkath or Rakkat, first mentioned in the Book of Joshua. In Talmudic times, the Jews still referred to it by this name.

Roman period

Herodian period
Tiberias was founded sometime around 20 CE in the Herodian Tetrarchy of Galilee and Perea by the Roman client king Herod Antipas, son of Herod the Great. Herod Antipas made it the capital of his realm in the Galilee and named it after the Roman emperor Tiberius. The city was built in immediate proximity to a spa which had developed around seventeen natural mineral hot springs, Hammat Tiberias. Tiberias was at first a strictly pagan city, but later became populated mainly by Jews, with its growing spiritual and religious status exerting a strong influence on balneological practices. Conversely, in Antiquities of the Jews, the Roman-Jewish historian Josephus calls the village with hot springs Emmaus, today's Hammat Tiberias, located near Tiberias. This name also appears in his work The Jewish War.

Under the Roman Empire, the city was known by its Koine Greek name Τιβεριάς (Tiberiás).

In the days of Herod Antipas, some of the most religiously orthodox Jews, who were struggling against the process of Hellenisation, which had affected even some priestly groups, refused to settle there: the presence of a cemetery rendered the site ritually unclean for the Jews and particularly for the priestly caste. Antipas settled many non-Jews there from rural Galilee and other parts of his domains in order to populate his new capital, and built a palace on the acropolis. The prestige of Tiberias was so great that the Sea of Galilee soon came to be named the Sea of Tiberias; however, the Jewish population continued to call it Yam HaKineret, its traditional name. The city was governed by a city council of 600 with a committee of ten until 44 CE, when a Roman procurator was set over the city after the death of Herod Agrippa I.

The crowd seeking Jesus after the miraculous feeding of the 5000 used these boats to travel back to Capernaum on the north-western part of the lake.

In 61 CE Herod Agrippa II annexed the city to his kingdom whose capital was Caesarea Philippi.

Great Revolt and Bar Kokhba revolt
During the First Jewish–Roman War, the Jewish rebels took control of the city and destroyed Herod's palace, and were able to prevent the city from being pillaged by the army of Agrippa II, the Jewish ruler who had remained loyal to Rome. Eventually, the rebels were expelled from Tiberias, and while most other cities in the provinces of Judaea, Galilee and Idumea were razed, Tiberias was spared this fate because its inhabitants had decided not to fight against Rome. It became a mixed city after the fall of Jerusalem in 70 CE; with Judea subdued, the surviving southern Jewish population migrated to the Galilee.

There is no direct indication that Tiberias, as well as the rest of Galilee, took part in the Bar Kokhba revolt of 132–136 CE, thus allowing it to exist, despite a heavy economic decline due to the war. Following the expulsion of Jews from Judea after 135 CE, Tiberias and its neighbour Sepphoris (Hebrew name: Tzippori) became the major Jewish cultural centres.

Late Roman period
According to the Talmud, in 145 CE, Rabbi Simeon bar Yochai, who was very familiar with the Galilee, hiding there for over a decade, "cleansed the city of ritual impurity", allowing the Jewish leadership to resettle there from the Judea, which they were forced to leave as fugitives. The Sanhedrin, the Jewish court, also fled from Jerusalem during the Great Jewish Revolt against Rome, and after several attempted moves, in search of stability, eventually settled in Tiberias in about 220 CE. It was to be its final meeting place before its disbanding in 425 CE. When Johanan bar Nappaha (d. 279) settled in Tiberias, the city became the focus of Jewish religious scholarship in the land and the so-named Jerusalem Talmud was compiled by his school in Tiberias between 230–270 CE. Tiberias' 13 synagogues served the spiritual needs of a growing Jewish population. Tombs of famous rabbis Yohanan ben Zakkai, Akiva and Maimonides are also located in the city.

Byzantine period
In the 6th century Tiberias was still the seat of Jewish religious learning. In light of this, the Letter of Simeon of Beth Arsham urged the Christians of Palaestina to seize the leaders of Judaism in Tiberias, to put them to the rack, and to compel them to command the Jewish king, Dhu Nuwas, to desist from persecuting the Christians in Najran.

In 614, Tiberias was the site where, during the final Jewish revolt against the Byzantine Empire, parts of the Jewish population supported the Persian invaders; the Jewish rebels were financed by Benjamin of Tiberias, a man of immense wealth; according to Christian sources, during the revolt Christians were massacred and churches destroyed. In 628, the Byzantine army returned to Tiberias upon the surrender of Jewish rebels and the end of the Persian occupation after they were defeated in the battle of Nineveh. A year later, influenced by radical Christian monks, Emperor Heraclius instigated a wide-scale slaughter of the Jews, which practically emptied Galilee of most its Jewish population, with survivors fleeing to Egypt.

Early Muslim period
Tiberias, or Tabariyyah in Arab transcription, was "conquered by (the Arab commander) Shurahbil in the year 634/15 [CE/AH] by capitulation; one half of the houses and churches were to belong to the Muslims, the other half to the Christians." Since 636 CE, Tiberias served as the regional capital, until Beit She'an took its place, following the Rashidun conquest. The Caliphate allowed 70 Jewish families from Tiberias to form the core of a renewed Jewish presence in Jerusalem and the importance of Tiberias to Jewish life declined. The caliphs of the Umayyad Dynasty built one of its square-plan palaces on the waterfront to the north of Tiberias, at Khirbat al-Minya. Tiberias was revitalised in 749, after Bet Shean was destroyed in an earthquake. Jewish scholarship flourished from the beginning of the 8th century to the end of the 10th, when the oral traditions of ancient Hebrew, still in use today, were codified. One of the leading members of the Tiberian Masoretic community was Aaron ben Moses ben Asher, who refined the oral tradition now known as Tiberian Hebrew. Both the Codex Cairensis and the Aleppo Codex were written in Tiberias as well as the Tiberian vocalization was devised here.

The Arab geographer al-Muqaddasi writing in 985, describes Tiberias as a hedonistic city afflicted by heat:-'For two months they dance; for two months they gobble; for two months they swat; for two months they go about naked; for two months they play the reed flute; and for two months they wallow in the mud. As "the capital of Jordan Province, and a city in the Valley of Canaan. ... The town is narrow, hot in summer and unhealthy...There are here eight natural hot baths, where no fuel need be used, and numberless basins besides of boiling water. The mosque is large and fine, and stands in the market-place. Its floor is laid in pebbles, set on stone drums, placed close one to another." According to Muqaddasi, those who suffered from scab or ulcers, and other such diseases came to Tiberias to bathe in the hot springs for three days. "Afterwards they dip in another spring which is cold, whereupon ... they become cured."

Tiberias was plagued by incursions by the radical Shi'ite Qarmatians at the beginning of the tenth century. During that period, the Academy of Eretz Israel left Tiberias for Jerusalem. Later in the same century, the region came under the control by the Fatimid Caliphate. By this time, Tiberias had experienced its last period of prosperity; dried fruit, oil, and wine had been exported to Cairo via the Via Maris, and the city was also known for its mat industry.

In 1033 Tiberias was again destroyed by an earthquake. A further earthquake in 1066 toppled the great mosque. Nasir-i Khusrou visited Tiberias in 1047, and describes a city with a "strong wall" which begins at the border of the lake and goes all around the town except on the water-side. Furthermore, he describes
 numberless buildings erected in the very water, for the bed of the lake in this part is rock; and they have built pleasure houses that are supported on columns of marble, rising up out of the water. The lake is very full of fish. [] The Friday Mosque is in the midst of the town. At the gate of the mosque is a spring, over which they have built a hot bath. [] On the western side of the town is a mosque known as the Jasmine Mosque (Masjid-i-Yasmin). It is a fine building and in the middle part rises a great platform (dukkan), where they have their mihrabs (or prayer-niches). All round those they have set jasmine-shrubs, from which the mosque derives its name.

Crusader period

During the First Crusade Tiberias was occupied by the Franks soon after the capture of Jerusalem. The city was given in fief to Tancred, who made it his capital of the Principality of Galilee in the Kingdom of Jerusalem; the region was sometimes called the Principality of Tiberias, or the Tiberiad. In 1099 the original site of the city was abandoned, and settlement shifted north to the present location. St. Peter's Church, originally built by the Crusaders, is still standing today, although the building has been altered and reconstructed over the years.

In the late 12th century Tiberias' Jewish community numbered 50 Jewish families, headed by rabbis, and at that time the best manuscripts of the Torah were said to be found there. In the 12th-century, the city was the subject of negative undertones in Islamic tradition. A hadith recorded by Ibn Asakir of Damascus (d. 1176) names Tiberias as one of the "four cities of hell." This could have been reflecting the fact that at the time, the town had a notable non-Muslim population.

In 1187, Saladin ordered his son al-Afdal to send an envoy to Count Raymond of Tripoli requesting safe passage through his fiefdom of Galilee and Tiberias. Raymond was obliged to grant the request under the terms of his treaty with Saladin. Saladin's force left Caesarea Philippi to engage the fighting force of the Knights Templar. The Templar force was destroyed in the encounter. Saladin then besieged Tiberias; after six days the town fell. On July 4, 1187 Saladin defeated the Crusaders coming to relieve Tiberias at the Battle of Hattin,  outside the city. However, during the Third Crusade, the Crusaders drove the Muslims out of the city and reoccupied it.

Rabbi Moshe ben Maimon, (Maimonides) also known as Rambam, a leading Jewish legal scholar, philosopher and physician of his period, died in 1204 in Egypt and was later buried in Tiberias. His tomb is one of the city's important pilgrimage sites. Yakut, writing in the 1220s, described Tiberias as a small town, long and narrow. He also describes the "hot salt springs, over which they have built Hammams which use no fuel."

Mamluk period
In 1265 the Crusaders were driven from the city by the Egyptian Mamluks, who ruled Tiberias until the Ottoman conquest in 1516.

Ottoman period

During the 16th century, Tiberias was a small village. Italian Rabbi Moses Bassola visited Tiberias during his trip to Palestine in 1522. He said on Tiberias that "it was a big city ... and now it is ruined and desolate". He described the village there, in which he said there were "ten or twelve" Muslim households. The area, according to Bassola, was dangerous "because of the Arabs", and in order to stay there, he had to pay the local governor for his protection.

As the Ottoman Empire expanded along the southern Mediterranean coast under Sultan Selim I, the Reyes Católicos (Catholic Monarchs) began establishing Inquisition commissions. Many Conversos, (Marranos and Moriscos) and Sephardi Jews fled in fear to the Ottoman provinces, settling at first in Constantinople, Salonika, Sarajevo, Sofia and Anatolia. The Sultan encouraged them to settle in Palestine. In 1558, a Portuguese-born marrano, Doña Gracia, was granted tax collecting rights in Tiberias and its surrounding villages by Suleiman the Magnificent. She envisaged the town becoming a refuge for Jews and obtained a permit to establish Jewish autonomy there. In 1561 her nephew Joseph Nasi, Lord of Tiberias, encouraged Jews to settle in Tiberias. Securing a firman from the Sultan, he and Joseph ben Adruth rebuilt the city walls and lay the groundwork for a textile (silk) industry, planting mulberry trees and urging craftsmen to move there. Plans were made for Jews to move from the Papal States, but when the Ottomans and the Republic of Venice went to war, the plan was abandoned.

At the end of the century (1596), the village of Tiberias had 54 households: 50 families and 4 bachelors. All were Muslims. The main product of the village at that time was wheat, while other products included barley, fruit, fish, goats and bee hives; the  total revenue was 3,360 akçe.

In 1624, when the Sultan recognized Fakhr-al-Din II as Lord of Arabistan (from Aleppo to the borders of Egypt), The 1660 destruction of Tiberias by the Druze resulted in abandonment of the city by its Jewish community, Unlike Tiberias, the nearby city of Safed recovered from its destruction, and wasn't entirely abandoned, remaining an important Jewish center in the Galilee.

In the 1720s, the Arab ruler Zahir al-Umar, of the Zaydani clan, fortified the town and made an agreement with the neighboring Bedouin tribes to prevent looting. Accounts from that time tell of the great admiration people had for Zahir, especially his war against bandits on the roads. Richard Pococke, who visited Tiberias in 1727, witnessed the building of a fort to the north of the city, and the strengthening of the old walls, attributing it to a dispute with the Pasha of Damascus. Under instructions from the Ottoman Porte, Sulayman Pasha al-Azm of Damascus besieged Tiberias in 1742, with the intention of eliminating Zahir, but his siege was unsuccessful. In the following year, Sulayman set out to repeat the attempt with even greater reinforcements, but he died en route.

Under Zahir's patronage, Jewish families were encouraged to settle in Tiberias. He invited Rabbi Chaim Abulafia of Smyrna to rebuild the Jewish community. The synagogue he built still stands today, located in the Court of the Jews.

In 1775, Ahmed el-Jazzar "the Butcher" brought peace to the region with an iron fist. In 1780, many Polish Jews settled in the town. During the 18th and 19th centuries it received an influx of rabbis who re-established it as a center for Jewish learning. An essay written by Rabbi Joseph Schwarz in 1850 noted that "Tiberias Jews suffered the least" during an Arab rebellion which took place in 1834. Around 600 people, including nearly 500 Jews, died when the town was devastated by the 1837 Galilee earthquake. An American expedition reported that Tiberias was still in a state of disrepair in 1847/1848. Rabbi Haim Shmuel Hacohen Konorti, born in Spain in 1792, settled in Tiberias at the age of 45 and was a driving force in the restoration of the city.

British Mandate

In the 1922 census of Palestine conducted by the British Mandate authorities, Tiberias had a population of 6,950 inhabitants, consisting of 4,427 Jews, 2,096 Muslims, 422 Christians, and five others. Initially the relationship between Arabs and Jews in Tiberias was good, with few incidents occurring in the Nebi Musa riots and the disturbances throughout Palestine in 1929. The first modern spa was built in 1929.

The landscape of the modern town was shaped by the great flood of November 11, 1934. Deforestation on the slopes above the town combined with the fact that the city had been built as a series of closely packed houses and buildings – usually sharing walls – built in narrow roads paralleling and closely hugging the shore of the lake. Flood waters carrying mud, stones, and boulders rushed down the slopes and filled the streets and buildings with water so rapidly that many people did not have time to escape; the loss of life and property was great. The city rebuilt on the slopes and the British Mandatory government planted the Swiss Forest on the slopes above the town to hold the soil and prevent similar disasters from recurring. A new seawall was constructed, moving the shoreline several yards out from the former shore. In October 1938, Arab militants murdered 19 Jews in Tiberias during the 1936–39 Arab revolt in Palestine. Between the April 8–9, 1948, sporadic shooting broke out between the Jewish and Arab neighborhoods of Tiberias. Arab Liberation Army and irregular forces attacked and closed the Rosh Pinnah road, isolating the northern Jewish settlements. On April 10, the Haganah launched a mortar barrage, killing some Arab residents. The local National Committee refused the offer of the Arab Liberation Army to take over defense of the city, but a small contingent of outside irregulars moved in.

During April 10–17, the Haganah attacked the city and refused to negotiate a truce, while the British refused to intervene. Newly arrived Arab refugees from Nasir ad-Din told of the civilians there being killed, news which brought panic to the residents of Tiberias. The Arab population of Tiberias (6,000 residents or 47.5% of the population) was evacuated by the British forces on 18 April 1948.

The Jewish population looted the Arab areas and had to be suppressed by force by the Haganah and Jewish police, who killed or injured several looters. On 30 December 1948, when David Ben-Gurion was staying in Tiberias, James Grover McDonald, the United States ambassador to Israel, requested to meet with him. McDonald presented a British ultimatum for Israeli troops to leave the Sinai peninsula, Egyptian territory. Israel rejected the ultimatum, but Tiberias became famous.

State of Israel

The city of Tiberias has been almost entirely Jewish since 1948. Many Sephardic and Mizrahi Jews settled in the city, following the Jewish exodus from Arab countries in late 1940s and the early 1950s. Over time, government housing was built to accommodate much of the new population, like in many other development towns.

In 1959, during Wadi Salib riots, the "Union des Nords-africains led by David Ben Haroush, organised a large-scale procession walking towards the nice suburbs of Haifa creating little damage but a great fear within the population. This small incident was taken as an occasion to express the social malaise of the different Oriental communities in Israel and riots spread quickly to other parts of the country; mostly in towns with a high percentage of the population having North African origins like in Tiberias, in Beer-Sheva, in Migdal-Haemek".

Over time, the city came to rely on tourism, becoming a major Galilean center for Christian pilgrims and internal Israeli tourism. The ancient cemetery of Tiberias and its old synagogues are also drawing religious Jewish pilgrims during religious holidays.

Tiberias consists of a small port on the shores of the Galilee lake for both fishing and tourist activities. Since the 1990s, the importance of the port for fishing was gradually decreasing, with the decline of the Tiberias lake level, due to continuing droughts and increased pumping of fresh water from the lake. It is expected that the lake of Tiberias will regain its original level (almost  higher than today), with the full operational capacity of Israeli desalination facilities by 2014.

In 2012, plans were announced for a new ultra-Orthodox neighborhood, Kiryat Sanz,  on a slope on the western side of the Kinneret.

Demographics
According to the Central Bureau of Statistics (CBS), as of December 2011, 41,700 inhabitants lived in Tiberias. According to CBS, as of December 2010 the city was rated 5 out of 10 on the socio-economic scale. The average monthly salary of an employee for the year 2009 was 4,845 NIS. Among today's population of Jews, many are Mizrahi and Sephardic.

Following Israel's withdrawal from Lebanon in 2000 many ex-South Lebanon Army soldiers and officers who fled from Lebanon settled in Tiberias with their families.

In the Ottoman registers of 1525, 1533, 1548, 1553, and 1572 all the residents were Muslims. The registers in 1596 recorded the population to consist of 50 families and 4 bachelors; all Muslim. In 1780, there were about 4,000 inhabitants, two thirds being Jews. In 1842, there were about 3,900 inhabitants, around a third of whom were Jews, the rest being Muslims and a few Christians. In 1850, Tiberias contained three synagogues which served the Sephardi community, which consisted of 80 families, and the Ashkenazim, numbering about 100 families. It was reported that the Jewish inhabitants of Tiberias enjoyed more peace and security than those of Safed to the north. In 1863, it was recorded that the Christian and Muslim elements made up three-quarters of the population (2,000 to 4,000). A population list from about 1887 showed that  Tiberias had a population of about 3,640; 2,025 Jews, 30 Latins, 215 Catholics, 15 Greek Catholics, and 1,355 Muslims.  In 1901, the Jews of Tiberias numbered about 2,000 in a total population of 3,600. By 1912, the population reached 6,500. This included 4,500 Jews, 1,600 Muslims and 400 Christians.

In the 1922 census of Palestine conducted by the British Mandate authorities, Tiberias had a population of 6,950 inhabitants, consisting of 4,427 Jews, 2,096 Muslims, 422 Christians, and five others. There were 5,381 Jews, 2,645 Muslims, 565 Christians and ten others in the 1931 census. By 1945, the population had increased to 6,000 Jews, 4,540 Muslims, 760 Christians with ten others.

During the 1948 Arab-Israeli War, Palestinian Arab residents of Tiberias besieged its Jewish quarter. Haganah troops then successfully attacked the Arab section of the city, and British troops evacuated the Arab residents upon their request. Some fled in the wake of news of the Deir Yassin massacre. The entire Arab population of the city was removed in 1948 by the British and partly because of Haganah decision. After the war had ended, a large number of Jewish immigrants to Israel settled in Tiberias. Today almost all of the population is Jewish.

Urban renewal and preservation

Ancient and medieval Tiberias was destroyed by a series of devastating earthquakes, and much of what was built after the major earthquake of 1837 was destroyed or badly damaged in the great flood of 1934. Houses in the newer parts of town, uphill from the waterfront, survived. In 1949, 606 houses, comprising almost all of the built-up area of the old quarter other than religious buildings, were demolished over the objections of local Jews who owned about half the houses. Wide-scale development began after the Six-Day War, with the construction of a waterfront promenade, open parkland, shopping streets, restaurants and modern hotels. Carefully preserved were several churches, including one with foundations dating from the Crusader period, the city's two Ottoman-era mosques, and several ancient synagogues. The city's old masonry buildings constructed of local black basalt with white limestone windows and trim have been designated historic landmarks. Also preserved are parts of the ancient wall, the Ottoman-era citadel, historic hotels, Christian pilgrim hostels, convents and schools.

Archaeology
A 2,000 year-old Roman theatre was discovered  under layers of debris and refuse at the foot of Mount Bernike south of modern Tiberias. It once seated over 7,000 people.

In 2004, excavations in Tiberias conducted by the Israel Antiquities Authority uncovered a structure dating to the 3rd century CE that may have been the seat of the Sanhedrin. At the time it was called Beit Hava'ad.

In June 2018, an underground Jewish mausoleum has been discovered. Archaeologist said that the mausoleum is between 1,900 to 2,000 years old as of 2018. The names of the dead, carved onto the ossuaries in Greek.

In January 2021, the foundations of a mosque dating to the earliest years of Muslim rule have been excavated just south of the Sea of Galilee by archaeologists led by Katia Cytryn-Silverman from the Hebrew University of Jerusalem. Built around 670 CE, it is considered to have been the first purpose-built mosque in the city.

Geography and climate

Tiberias has been severely damaged by earthquakes since antiquity. Earthquakes are known to have occurred in 30, 33, 115, 306, 363, 419, 447, 631–32 (aftershocks continued for a month), 1033, 1182, 1202, 1546, 1759, 1837, 1927 and 1943.

The city is located above the Dead Sea Transform and is one of the cities in Israel that is most at risk to earthquakes (along with Safed, Beit She'an, Kiryat Shmona, and Eilat).

Health care

In 1885, a Scottish doctor and minister, David Watt Torrance, opened a mission hospital in Tiberias that accepted patients of all races and religions. In 1894, it moved to larger premises at Beit abu Shamnel abu Hannah. In 1923 his son, Dr. Herbert Watt Torrance, was appointed head of the hospital. After the establishment of the State of Israel, it became a maternity hospital supervised by the Israeli Department of Health. After its closure in 1959, the building became a guesthouse until 1999, when it was renovated and reopened as the Scots Hotel.

Sports

Its first football club established in 1925 was Maccabi Tiberias, but folded in the 1990s after financial difficulties.

Hapoel Tiberias represented the city in the top division of football for several seasons in the 1960s and 1980s, but eventually dropped into the regional leagues and folded due to financial difficulties.

Following Hapoel's demise, a new club, Ironi Tiberias, was established, which currently plays in Liga Leumit. 

6 Nations Championship and Heineken Cup winner Jamie Heaslip was born in Tiberias.

The Tiberias Marathon is an annual road race held along the Sea of Galilee in Israel with a field in recent years of approximately 1000 competitors. The course follows an out-and-back format around the southern tip of the sea, and was run concurrently with a 10k race along an abbreviated version of the same route. In 2010 the 10k race was moved to the afternoon before the marathon.

Twin towns – sister cities

Tiberias is twinned with:

 Great Neck, United States (2002)
 Milwaukee, United States (2000)
 Montecatini Terme, Italy (1979)
 Montpellier, France (1983)
 Saint-Raphaël, France (2006)
 Tulsa, United States (1990)
 Worms, Germany (1986)
 Wuxi, China (2006)

Notable people
Prominent people predating the State of Israel, listed by year of birth:
 Rabbi Meir Baal HaNes (Rabbi Meir the miracle maker), 2nd-century CE Jewish sage
 Johanan bar Nappaha (180–279), rabbi
 Sulayman ibn Ahmad at-Tabarani (874–971), Muslim hadith scholar and collector
 Akhiyahu HaKohen (fl. 910 CE), rabbi and Hebrew-language grammarian
 Zahir al-Umar (c. 1689–1775), virtually autonomous Arab ruler of northern Palestine in the mid-18th century
 Shemariah Catarivas, 18th-century Talmudic writer
 Jacob ha-Cohen Sekili (1846–1918), rabbi
 Hassib Sabbagh (1920–2010), Palestinian billionaire businessman, activist and philanthropist

Prominent people in the State of Israel or born/active there, listed alphabetically:
 Yossi Abulafia (born 1944), writer and graphic artist
 Gadi Eizenkot (born 1960), IDF Chief of General Staff (Feb. 2015 – Jan. 2019)
 Sarai Givaty (born 1982), actress, singer-songwriter, and model
 Menahem Golan (1929–2014), film producer, screenwriter and director
 Jamie Heaslip (born 1983), Irish rugby union player, born in Tiberias
 Elad Levy (born 1972 in Tiberias), neurosurgeon known for his contributions in the management of stroke
 Shlomit Nir (born 1952), Olympic swimmer
 Patrick Denis O'Donnell (1922–2005), Commandant of the Irish Defence Forces, military historian, UN peace-keeper stationed in Tiberias in the 1960s
 Yisroel Ber Odesser (born c. 1888 in Tiberias – 1994), Breslover Hasid and rabbi
 Moshe Peretz (born 1983), Mizrahi pop singer-songwriter and composer
 Eldad Ronen (born 1976), Olympic competitive sailor
 Shem-Tov Sabag (born 1959), Olympic marathoner
 Bechor-Shalom Sheetrit (1895–1967), politician, government minister of Israel
 Shmuel Toledano (born 1921), former Mossad agent and member of the Knesset
 Ya'akov Moshe Toledano (1880–1960), rabbi, Israeli Minister of Religions (1958–1960)

See also
 1660 destruction of Tiberias
 Bethmaus, ancient Jewish village next to Tiberias
 List of modern names for biblical place names
 Old synagogues of Tiberias
 Baruch Padeh Medical Center

References

Bibliography

 
 
 
 
 
 
 
 
 
 
 
 
 
 
 
 
 
 
 
 
 
  copied and uploaded at "hebrewbooks.org"

External links

 
 City council website  Municipality Site in English
 Place To Visit in Tiberias (English)
 Tiberias – City of Treasures: The official website of the Tiberias Excavation Project
 Hamat Tiberias National Park: description, photo gallery
 Nefesh B'Nefesh Community Guide for Tiveria-Tiberias, Israel
 Survey of Western Palestine, Map 6: IAA, Wikimedia commons
 Old maps and views of Tiberias (1493-1963) - Eran Laor Cartographic Collection, The National Library of Israel
 Ancient Tiberias - a site dedicated to the preservation of Ancient Tiberias (Hebrew).

 
Ancient Jewish settlements of Galilee
Tiberias
Crusader castles
Castles and fortifications of the Kingdom of Jerusalem
Castles in Israel
Cities in Northern District (Israel)
Establishments in the Herodian Tetrarchy
Holy cities
Jewish pilgrimage sites
Roman towns and cities in Israel
Populated places established in the 1st century
Talmud places
Holy cities of Judaism
Sea of Galilee